The Chennai Super Kings (often abbreviated as "CSK") are a franchise cricket team based in Chennai, Tamil Nadu, that plays in the Indian Premier League (IPL). The team was founded in 2008 and is currently captained by M.S.Dhoni and coached by Stephen Fleming, a former New Zealand cricketer. The brand value of Chennai Super Kings was estimated to be  million, making them the second most valuable franchise in the IPL, behind only the Mumbai Indians.

Chennai Super Kings have reached the IPL playoffs nine times, and have won the title four times, winning their latest title in the 2021 tournament. They played their first Twenty20 match in the first season of the IPL against Kings XI Punjab.

The first list includes all the players who have played in at least one match for the Chennai Super Kings. The second list comprises all those players who have captained the team in at least one match, arranged in the order of the first match as captain.

Players

 Players in bold are still active for CSK.

Captains

References

External 

Chennai-related lists
Lists of Indian Premier League cricketers